Hilobothea caracensis is a species of beetle in the family Cerambycidae. It was described by Monné and Martins in 1979. It is known from Brazil.

References

Colobotheini
Beetles described in 1979